Elkin Umbagai (February 19, 1921 – January 24, 1980) was an Aboriginal Australian leader and educationalist. Born in a Presbyterian Mission in the  Kunmunya Aboriginal Reserve in Western Australia, Umbagai's family mediated between missionaries and Aboriginal groups, and according to the Australian Dictionary of Biography she was "reputed to be the first Australian to receive the interpreter's badge of the Girl Guides Association". After marrying in a Christian marriage ceremony in 1969, Umbagai and her family founded the Mowanjum Aboriginal Community outside Derby, Western Australia.

There she became a pioneering educator in linguistics, archaeology and anthropology, and was a translator between English and Worrorra.

References

1921 births
1980 deaths
Aboriginal peoples of Western Australia
Australian educational theorists
20th-century Australian women